Fiona Ferro was the defending champion, but she chose not to participate, as she was competing at the Summer Olympics.

Top seed Danielle Collins won her maiden WTA Tour singles title, defeating Elena-Gabriela Ruse in the final, 6–4, 6–2. Collins did not drop a set during the tournament.

Seeds

Draw

Finals

Top half

Bottom half

Qualifying

Seeds

Qualifiers

Draw

First qualifier

Second qualifier

Third qualifier

Fourth qualifier

References

External links
 Main draw
 Qualifying draw

Internazionali Femminili di Palermo - Singles
2021 Singles